George DeWitt Lynch III (born September 3, 1970) is an American former professional basketball player who played in the National Basketball Association (NBA) from 1993 to 2005.

Early life
Lynch was born two months premature and had to spend more than a month in an incubator. He was raised in Roanoke, Virginia, and played basketball at Patrick Henry High for coach Woody Deans. Lynch was part of the 1988 Virginia State Champion Team at Patrick Henry. For his senior year, he transferred to Flint Hill School, a prep school located outside Washington, D.C. to better his chances at college prospects.

College 
Lynch played four years at North Carolina under coach Dean Smith. Known for his impact on the defensive end, Lynch sported averages of 12.5 points and almost eight rebounds per game during his college career. With 1.7 steals per game, he finished his career ranked second on the UNC all-time list.

In his sophomore year, Lynch reached the NCAA Final Four with the team. As a team captain, he led North Carolina to an NCAA title in 1993 and made the All-Final Four Tournament team.

Professional career
He was selected by the Los Angeles Lakers with the 12th overall pick in that year's NBA draft. Lynch would be the last Laker to wear #34 before he was traded to the Vancouver Grizzlies along with Anthony Peeler in 1996 in order to open up salary cap space to sign Shaquille O'Neal. He joined the Philadelphia 76ers as a free agent in 1999.

With Theo Ratliff, Tyrone Hill, Eric Snow, Dikembe Mutombo, Allen Iverson, and coach Larry Brown Lynch helped form one of the better defenses in the league. With the 76ers, Lynch reached the 2001 NBA Finals.

After playing with the 76ers for three seasons, he was traded to the Charlotte Hornets in a three-way trade also involving Derrick Coleman, Jérôme Moïso, Robert Traylor, and Vonteego Cummings, among others, in 2001, retiring after 2004–05.

Post-playing career
Lynch worked as a personal trainer, in 2006 he founded a non-profit youth basketball program (Flight Nine Basketball) in Dallas, which he directed until 2010.

On December 20, 2006, he joined the Southern Methodist University men's basketball staff under head coach Matt Doherty, who was part of the 1981–82 NCAA championship team. Lynch became the team's administrative assistant/graduate manager. He spent 2010–2012 at UC Irvine as a strength and conditioning coach for basketball and an assistant athletics director for community relations before re-joining the SMU men's basketball staff in 2012 under head coach and fellow UNC alum Larry Brown. In April 2018, Lynch was named head coach of Clark Atlanta University. In 2020, his contract was not renewed.

In October 2022, Lynch joined the Charlotte Hornets’ TV broadcasting staff as a studio analyst.

References

External links

 SMU Mustangs bio

1970 births
Living people
African-American basketball players
American expatriate basketball people in Canada
American men's basketball players
Basketball coaches from Virginia
Basketball players from Virginia
Charlotte Hornets players
Clark Atlanta Panthers men's basketball coaches
Grand Rapids Drive coaches
Los Angeles Lakers draft picks
Los Angeles Lakers players
McDonald's High School All-Americans
New Orleans Hornets players
North Carolina Tar Heels men's basketball players
Philadelphia 76ers players
Power forwards (basketball)
Small forwards
SMU Mustangs men's basketball coaches
Southern Methodist University alumni
Sportspeople from Roanoke, Virginia
UC Irvine Anteaters men's basketball coaches
Universiade gold medalists for the United States
Universiade medalists in basketball
Vancouver Grizzlies players
21st-century African-American sportspeople
20th-century African-American sportspeople